Josh Magette (born November 28, 1989) is an American professional basketball player for the Tasmania JackJumpers of the Australian National Basketball League (NBL). He played college basketball for the University of Alabama in Huntsville.

Early life
Born in Birmingham, Alabama, he graduated from Spain Park High School in Hoover, Alabama.  He spent his collegiate career at the University of Alabama in Huntsville where he led the Chargers to three Gulf South Conference championships and two NCAA Men's Division II Basketball Championship Elite Eight appearances.  He ended his career as the school's and the Gulf South Conference's all-time leader in assists.

Professional career

Landstede Basketbal (2012–2013)
After going undrafted in the 2012 NBA draft, Magette joined the Memphis Grizzlies for the 2012 NBA Summer League, but did not appear in any games for the team. In August 2012, he signed with Landstede Basketbal of the Netherlands for the 2012–13 season. In 39 games for Landstede, he averaged 11.5 points, 2.8 rebounds, 5.7 assists and 2.5 steals per game.

Los Angeles D-Fenders (2013–2014)
On November 1, 2013, Magette was selected in the second round of the 2013 NBA Development League Draft by the Los Angeles D-Fenders. In 52 games for the D-Fenders in 2013–14, he averaged 10.4 points, 3.5 rebounds, 6.9 assists and 1.9 steals per game.

Koroivos Amaliadas (2014–2015)
In July 2014, Magette joined the Orlando Magic for the 2014 NBA Summer League. On August 14, 2014, he signed with the Greek League club Koroivos Amaliadas. In 28 games for Koroivos in 2014–15, he averaged 7.1 points, 3.5 rebounds, 4.8 assists and 1.4 steals per game.

Return to the D-Fenders (2015–2017)
On October 31, 2015, Magette was acquired by the Los Angeles D-Fenders, returning to the franchise for a second stint. In 54 games for the D-fenders in 2015–16, he averaged 12.1 points, 4.4 rebounds, 8.8 assists and 2.4 steals per game.

In July 2016, Magette joined the Brooklyn Nets for the 2016 NBA Summer League. On October 3, 2016, he signed with the Atlanta Hawks, but was waived on October 22 after appearing in three preseason games. On October 30, he was reacquired by the Los Angeles D-Fenders.

Atlanta Hawks (2017–2018)
In June 2017, Magette joined the Atlanta Hawks for the 2017 NBA Summer League. On September 6, two months after a successful Summer League stint, he was signed to the Hawks as the team's first ever two-way contract. Under the terms of the deal, he split time between the Hawks and their new G-League affiliate, the Erie BayHawks. Magette made his NBA debut on October 18, 2017, in a 117–111 victory for the Atlanta Hawks where he sank his first NBA shot attempt, which was a deep three from the left wing. He had another phenomenal year in the G-League, averaging 15.1 points, 10.2 assists, 3.3 rebounds, and 1.2 steals. Additionally, he had a solid rookie season in the NBA averaging over 3 assists per game.

Cedevita Zagreb (2018)
On June 27, 2018, it was announced that he will join the Golden State Warriors for the 2018 NBA Summer League. On July 27, 2018, he signed with Croatian club Cedevita Zagreb. On November 10, 2018, he was released by Cedevita.

Gran Canaria (2018–2019)
On December 25, 2018, Magette agreed to join Euroleague team CB Gran Canaria.

Magette played for the San Antonio Spurs during the 2019 NBA Summer League.

Orlando Magic (2019–2020) 

On July 17, 2019, the Orlando Magic agreed to sign Magette to a two-way contract. On July 23, the deal was officially announced. On January 11, 2020, the Orlando Magic signed with Magette a 10-day contract, but was later waived by the Orlando Magic on January 14, 2020.

Lakeland Magic (2020) 
The Lakeland Magic re-signed Magette after his release from the parent club. In his G League return, he registered 24 points, six assists, two rebounds, two steals and a block in a game against the Canton Charge. Magette was named Midseason All-NBA G League for the Eastern Conference. On March 11, he posted 25 points, 15 assists, eight rebounds and two steals in a win over the Erie BayHawks. Magette averaged 21.1 points, 10.6 assists, 4.1 rebounds and 2.0 steals per game during the 2019-20 G League season. He was named to the All-NBA G League Second Team.

Darüşşafaka (2020–2021)
On December 6, 2020, Magette signed with Darüşşafaka of the Basketball Super League.

Tasmania JackJumpers (2021–present)
On July 28, 2021, Magette signed with the Tasmania JackJumpers for the 2021–22 NBL season. He helped the JackJumpers reach the NBL Grand Final in their first season.

On June 8, 2022, Magette re-signed with the JackJumpers for the 2022–23 NBL season. He underwent season-ending surgery in February 2023 to repair a broken cheekbone and fractured eye socket.

NBA career statistics

Regular season

|-
| style="text-align:left;"| 
| style="text-align:left;"|Atlanta
| 18 || 0 || 12.0 || .326 || .364 || 1.000 || 1.1 || 3.2 || .4 || .1 || 2.6
|-
| style="text-align:left;"| 
| style="text-align:left;"|Orlando
| 8 || 0 || 4.8 || .333 || .250 || .500 || .8 || .6 || .4 || .1 || 1.5
|- class="sortbottom"
| style="text-align:center;" colspan="2"| Career
| 26 || 0 || 9.8 || .328 || .346 || .900 || 1.0 || 2.4 || .4 || .1 || 2.2

National team career
Magette played with the senior USA men's national team in early 2020, against Puerto Rico, at the 2021 FIBA AmeriCup qualification. Team USA faced Puerto Rico twice and won both games. He was also named to the 2021 USA Select Team, which trains with the men's Olympic basketball team.

References

1989 births
Living people
ABA League players
Alabama–Huntsville Chargers men's basketball players
American expatriate basketball people in Australia
American expatriate basketball people in Croatia
American expatriate basketball people in Greece
American expatriate basketball people in the Netherlands
American expatriate basketball people in Spain
American expatriate basketball people in Turkey
American men's basketball players
Atlanta Hawks players
Basketball players from Birmingham, Alabama
CB Gran Canaria players
Darüşşafaka Basketbol players
Erie BayHawks (2017–2019) players
KK Cedevita players
Koroivos B.C. players
Lakeland Magic players
Landstede Hammers players
Liga ACB players
Los Angeles D-Fenders players
Orlando Magic players
Point guards
Tasmania JackJumpers players
Undrafted National Basketball Association players
United States men's national basketball team players